Kaarlo Mauri af Heurlin (30 March 1915, Espoo – 5 February 1985, Helsinki) was a Finnish farmer and politician. He was a member of the Parliament of Finland from 1966 to 1970, representing the Social Democratic Party of Finland (SDP).

References

1915 births
1985 deaths
People from Espoo
People from Uusimaa Province (Grand Duchy of Finland)
Social Democratic Party of Finland politicians
Members of the Parliament of Finland (1966–70)
University of Helsinki alumni